Sign of the Dragonhead is the seventh studio album of the German symphonic metal band Leaves' Eyes. It is their first full-length release with Elina Siirala as lead vocalist, following Liv Kristine's departure in 2016.

Track listing

Notes
 The limited, digipak and box set editions of the album contain a second instrumental disc with all the tracks from the regular edition.

Personnel 
Leaves' Eyes
 Joris Nijenhuis – drums, choir vocals, assistant recording
 Pete Streit – guitars
 Elina Siirala – female vocals, choir vocals
 Thorsten Bauer – guitars, bass, mandolin, choir vocals, songwriting, assistant recording, orchestral arrangements
 Alexander Krull – growling vocals, choir vocals, samples, programming, songwriting, lyrics, recording, engineering, mixing, mastering, production, cover art concept

Additional musicians
 London Voices – choir vocals
 Christian Roch – uilleann pipes, flute, whistles
 Christoph Kutzer – cello
 Thomas Roth – nyckelharpa
 Full Moon Choir – additional choir vocals
 Uwe Fichtner – choir vocals
 Andreas Bösch – choir vocals
 Christel Fichtner – additional choir vocals
 Sophie Zaaijer – solo violin
 Fieke van den Hurk – hurdy gurdy
 Knuth Jerxsen – percussion, effected drums

Production
 Stefan Heilemann – cover art concept, artwork, band photography
 Victor Smolski – recording
 Mat Bartram – recording
 Chris Parker – assistant recording

Charts

References

External links 
Official website

2018 albums
Leaves' Eyes albums
AFM Records albums
Nuclear Blast albums
Albums produced by Alexander Krull